Olivia Lewis (born 29 April 1999) is an Australian netball player in the Suncorp Super Netball league, playing for the Melbourne Vixens.

Lewis was born  in Subiaco and raised in Wellard WA and was signed by the West Coast Fever ahead of the 2019 season. The defender grew up playing netball for the Rockingham District Netball Association before moving to Coastal Sharks academy in Western Australia.

A prodigious junior talent saw her win national MVP awards at under 17 and 19 levels. Prior to being picked up by the Fever, she was MVP for the club's reserves team, the Western Sting in the Australian Netball League, and was a part of their maiden ANL premiership in 2017.  Playing in the Western Australian Netball league, Olivia was awarded the Jill McIntosh medal as the Most Valuable player for season 2018.

She made her Suncorp super netball debut in round 1 of 2019 against Adelaide Thunderbirds.  A promising first season saw her take to the court 9 times and saw her receive the Fever coaches award which culminated in her being selected in the 2019 Australian Development squad. In 2020 she was impressive enough in her 10 appearances to again be selected in the Australian Development squad for 2020/2021. In 2021 her 8 appearances were as an impact player with very little court time, however, she was again selected in the 2021/22 Australian Development squad.

She signed with the Melbourne Vixens for the 2022 season, debuting in round 1 as Vixens player 59.  She was part of a resurgent Vixens team, taking to the court 12 times, including in their unsuccessful Grand Final against Fever.   Olivia was named joint captain of Victoria Fury for their 2022 campaign in the Australian Netball Championships leading them into the Gold medal match against South Australian Fury.

References

External links
 West Coast Fever profile
 Suncorp Super Netball profile
 Netball Draft Central profile
 Melbourne Vixens profile

Australian netball players
West Coast Fever players
Living people
1999 births
Australian Netball League players
Suncorp Super Netball players
Netball players from Western Australia
Western Sting players
West Australian Netball League players
Melbourne Vixens players